Bettina Bunge (born 13 June 1963) is a retired German tennis player. Born in Adliswil, Switzerland, she was part of a large group of successful German players in the 1980s, which also included Steffi Graf, Claudia Kohde-Kilsch, Sylvia Hanika, and Eva Pfaff.

Career
With German nationality as the daughter of a German businessman, she was born in Switzerland, and resided in Peru for more than 13 years. She was a national champion in Peru at the age of 13, and later moved to Miami, Florida. She dealt with a series of injuries (ear and knee, among others) throughout her career.

Bunge was a professional player from 1978 to 1989, appearing for the first time at No. 150 in July 1978. Her career-high ranking of No. 6 she achieved in 1983. In 1982, she registered her all-time best achievement in Grand Slam singles competition when she reached the semifinals of Wimbledon.

She won four singles tournaments, including the tournaments at the German Open, Houston, and Tokyo in 1982, and Oakland in 1983. She was finalist in Sydney in 1979, Stockholm in 1980, Houston, Tampa, Cincinnati (indoor) and Tokyo in 1981, Mahwah in 1982 and Knokke in 1987.

Bunge won four doubles tournaments, including the tournaments of Pan Pacific in Tokyo with Steffi Graf in 1986 and The Belgian Open with Manuela Maleeva in 1987. She was a finalist at the German Open with Claudia Kohde-Kilsch in 1982, the Swiss Open with Eva Pfaff in 1985, and New England, also Pfaff, in 1987.

She was a part of the German Federation Cup Team from 1980 to 1983, 1985 to 1987 and 1989. She won the 1987 WTA Comeback of the Year Award. Bunge lives in Coral Gables, Florida.

WTA career finals

Singles: 13 (4–9)

Doubles: 10 (4–6)

Grand Slam singles performance timeline

See also
 Manuela Maleeva
 Steffi Graf
 List of female tennis players

References

External links
 
 
 

West German female tennis players
People from Horgen District
1963 births
Living people
German expatriate sportspeople in Switzerland
German expatriates in Monaco
German expatriate sportspeople in Peru